In mathematics,  Gram's theorem states that an algebraic set in a finite-dimensional vector space invariant under some linear group can be defined by absolute invariants. . It is named after J. P. Gram, who published it in 1874.

References
. Reprinted by Academic Press (1971), .
.

Invariant theory
Theorems in algebraic geometry